Kunming North railway station (昆明北站, Kūnmíng Běi Zhàn) is an old railway station in Panlong District, Kunming, the capital of China's Yunnan Province. It was the terminal of the metre gauge Kunming–Hai Phong Railway, but now only sees very limited service.

French Construction
Built by the French in the early 20th century, the Kunming–Hai Phong Railway runs from Kunming to Hekou on Vietnamese border, and then continues to Vietnam. As late as the last years of the 20th century, every Friday and Sunday, a train would depart from Kunming North railway station to Hanoi, the capital of Vietnam. It took about 16 hours to reach Hekou, and 32 hours to Hanoi.

Present State
Due to the deterioration of the railway line, the long distance narrow-gauge service has been cancelled. Since 2012, some local narrow gauge commuter train service resumes at Kunming North railway station, in particular one daily train to Shizui railway station (石咀站) on the western outskirts of Kunming, and two trains daily to Wangjiaying railway station (王家营站) to the east of the city. However, the service was terminated again in December 2017 due to the construction of Kunming Metro Line 4.

The Yunnan Railway Museum (云南铁路博物馆, Yúnnán Tiělù Bówùguǎn) is adjacent to the station's tracks. As of 2012, most of the museum is closed due to the Kunming Metro construction and the replacement of the terminal building, but its historical railcar exhibit is still open. In September 2014, the museum was completely reopened to the public. Historic railcars and locomotives are settled in a trainshed across from the newly constructed terminal building, and are accessible by a footbridge across the railway station.

Metro station

North Railway Station, located in Panlong District, Kunming, is an interchange station among Line 2, Line 4 and Line 5 of Kunming Metro. A cross-platform interchange is provided between Line 4 and Line 5.

See also
 Kunming railway station
 Kunming South railway station

References

Railway stations in Yunnan
Transport in Kunming
Railway museums in China